Hungary competed at the 2012 Winter Youth Olympics in Innsbruck, Austria. The Hungarian team consisted of 9 athletes in 6 different sports.

Medalists

Alpine skiing

Hungary qualified one boy and girl in alpine skiing.

Boy

Girl

Biathlon

Hungary qualified one boy.

Boy

Cross country skiing

Hungary qualified one boy.

Boy

Sprint

Ice hockey

Hungary qualified one boy and girl to compete in the skills challenge competition.

Boy 

Girl

Short track speed skating

Hungary qualified one male and one female short track speed skater.

Boy

Girl

Mixed team relay

Ski jumping

Hungary qualified one boy in ski jumping.

Boy

See also
Hungary at the 2012 Summer Olympics

References

2012 in Hungarian sport
Nations at the 2012 Winter Youth Olympics
Hungary at the Youth Olympics